Milorad Balabanović (born 18 January 1990) is a Serbia football midfielder who plays for Serbian SuperLiga club FK Javor Ivanjica.

References

External links
 
 Milorad Balabanović stats at utakmica.rs
 
 

1990 births
Living people
Footballers from Novi Sad
Association football midfielders
Serbian footballers
FK Palić players
RFK Novi Sad 1921 players
FK Proleter Novi Sad players
FK Spartak Subotica players
OFK Bačka players
FK Borac Čačak players
FK Krupa players
FK Rad players
FK Javor Ivanjica players
Serbian First League players
Serbian SuperLiga players
Premier League of Bosnia and Herzegovina players